Fernandoa adenophylla, synonym Haplophragma adenophyllum, is a species of flowering plant in the family Bignoniaceae that is native to the Andaman Islands, India (Assam and other states), Bangladesh, Myanmar, Cambodia, Laos, Peninsular Malaysia, Thailand and Vietnam. It is commonly known as katsagon, marodphali, petthan, and  Karen wood.

References

Bignoniaceae
Flora of Assam (region)
Flora of the Andaman Islands
Flora of Bangladesh
Flora of Myanmar
Flora of Cambodia
Flora of Laos
Flora of Peninsular Malaysia
Flora of Thailand
Flora of Vietnam